The 2014 World RX of Italy was the 10th round of the inaugural season of the FIA World Rallycross Championship. The event was held at the Franciacorta International Circuit in Franciacorta, Lombardy. It was a significant round as Petter Solberg scored enough points with his 3rd-place finish to wrap up the 2014 drivers' championship with 2 rounds to go, making him the first person to win two FIA-sanctioned World Championships, having won the 2003 World Rally Championship.

Heats

Semi-finals

Semi-final 1

Semi-final 2

Final

Championship standings after the event

References

External links

|- style="text-align:center"
|width="35%"|Previous race:2014 World RX of Germany
|width="30%"|FIA World Rallycross Championship2014 season
|width="35%"|Next race:2014 World RX of Turkey
|- style="text-align:center"
|width="35%"|Previous race:None
|width="30%"|World RX of Italy
|width="35%"|Next race:2015 World RX of Italy
|- style="text-align:center"

Italy
World RX